USS Alexander  Hamilton may refer to the following ships operated by the United States government:

, was a U.S. Navy revenue cutter in service from 1871 to 1906, and a participant in the Spanish–American War
, was a U.S. Coast Guard cutter commissioned in 1937 and sunk by a U-boat in January 1942
, was a U.S. Navy submarine in service from 1963 to 1993
, is a U.S. Coast Guard cutter in service from 1967 to 2011
, is a U.S. Coast Guard cutter commissioned in 2014.

See also

United States Navy ship names